is a graduate level law school in Saitama, Saitama Prefecture, Japan. The school closed in 2015.

External links
 Omiya Law School (jp icon)

Defunct private universities and colleges in Japan
Universities and colleges in Saitama Prefecture